Marcin Cieślak is a Polish competitive swimmer who specializes in butterfly. He currently represents the Cali Condors which is part of the International Swimming League. At the 2012 Summer Olympics in London, he competed in the men's 200 metre butterfly, finishing in 19th place overall in the heats, but failing to qualify for the semifinals.

References

External links

1992 births
Living people
Olympic swimmers of Poland
Polish male butterfly swimmers
Polish male freestyle swimmers
Swimmers from Warsaw
Swimmers at the 2010 Summer Youth Olympics
Swimmers at the 2012 Summer Olympics
Florida Gators men's swimmers
20th-century Polish people
21st-century Polish people